Arlan Hockey Club (Arlan Kókshetaý hokkeı klýby), commonly referred as Arlan Kokshetau, is a professional ice hockey team  based in Kokshetau, Kazakhstan. Founded in 2009, they play in the Kazakhstan Hockey Championship, the top level of ice hockey in Kazakhstan. The team also won the 2018–19 IIHF Continental Cup, becoming the first team from Kazakhstan to do so.

Season-by-season record
Note: GP = Games played, W = Wins, L = Losses, T = Ties, OTW = Overtime/shootout wins, OTL = Overtime/shootout losses, Pts = Points, GF = Goals for, GA = Goals against

Achievements
IIHF Continental Cup:
Winners (1): 2018/2019
Kazakhstan Hockey Championship:
Winners (1): 2017–18
Runners-up (2): 2013–14, 2014–15
3rd place (1): 2012–13
Kazakhstan Hockey Cup:
Winners (2): 2012, 2013

Head coaches
Dmitri Bondarev 2011–12
Leonīds Beresņevs 2012–13
Vladimír Klinga 2013–present

External links
Official website

Sport in Kokshetau
Ice hockey teams in Kazakhstan